The Ohio State Buckeyes football team competes as part of the National Collegiate Athletic Association (NCAA) Division I Football Bowl Subdivision (FBS), representing the Ohio State University in the East division of the Big Ten Conference.  Since the establishment of the football program in 1890, the Buckeyes have played in 51 bowl games.  Included in these games are 27 appearances in the "big four" bowl games (the Rose, Sugar, Orange, and Fiesta), 10 appearances in the Bowl Championship Series, including one national championship victory in the 2003 Fiesta Bowl and two appearances in the BCS National Championship Game, and an appearance in the inaugural College Football Playoff.

Ohio State's first bowl game came during the 1920 season when, under the leadership of eighth year head coach John Wilce, the team went on to the Rose Bowl where they would be defeated by California 28–0.  Following their first Rose Bowl appearance, the school would not make another bowl appearance until 1949, when head coach Wes Fesler led the Buckeyes to the Rose Bowl again, this time defeating the California Golden Bears 17–14.  Following Fesler, Woody Hayes took over the position of head coach at Ohio State and during his career would lead the Buckeyes to eleven bowl games and compiling a 5–6 record.  The Buckeyes appeared in the Rose Bowl eight times during Hayes' tenure and would go 4–4 in those games.  Hayes would also lead the Buckeyes to one Orange Bowl, one Sugar Bowl, and one Gator Bowl appearance during his time as head coach.

Earle Bruce became the head coach of the Ohio State Buckeyes following Woody Hayes in 1979.  Bruce would lead the Buckeyes to the Rose Bowl in his first season, coming one point away from a national championship, losing to the USC Trojans 17–16.  Over Bruce's career, the Buckeyes would make eight bowl appearances going 5–3 in those games.  Ohio State also made two Rose Bowl appearances under Bruce, in which the team went 0–2.  Following Bruce, John Cooper became the head coach of the Buckeyes and would lead the school to ten bowl appearances, including one Rose Bowl victory in 1997, the school's first Rose Bowl victory since 1974.  Cooper would lead the Buckeyes to a 3–8 bowl record during his tenure.  Cooper would also lead the Buckeyes to the Sugar Bowl in 1999, the first Bowl Championship Series appearance for Ohio State.

Jim Tressel was hired as the head coach of the Buckeyes in 2001 and would remain head coach at the university until 2010.  Under Tressel, Ohio State made a bowl appearance in all his ten seasons as head coach and made eight BCS bowl appearances for a total of nine appearances for the university, the most of any other school.  Tressel would also lead the Buckeyes to the national championship game in 2002, where the Buckeyes defeated the Miami Hurricanes 31–24 in double overtime for their first national championship since 1970.  Tressel compiled an overall bowl record of 5–4 with one vacated victory, including three appearances in the BCS National Championship Game, four appearances in the Fiesta Bowl, one in the Rose Bowl, one in the Sugar Bowl, one in the Outback Bowl, and one in the Alamo Bowl.  Ohio State would also reach the Gator Bowl in 2011 under head coach Luke Fickell, which they would lose 24–17 to the Florida Gators.

In November 2011, Urban Meyer was hired as the head coach and has led the Buckeyes to bowl games in five seasons during his time at Ohio State. Meyer led the Buckeyes to their tenth BCS bowl against Clemson in the Orange Bowl. In 2014, Meyer led the Buckeyes to the inaugural College Football Playoff, where the Buckeyes defeated Alabama in the Sugar Bowl and Oregon in the College Football Playoff National Championship, to win the program's eighth national championship. In their 2015–16 bowl appearance, Ohio State defeated Notre Dame in the Fiesta Bowl. The win in that game brought Ohio State's overall bowl record to 22 wins and 24 losses. Meyer also led the Buckeyes to the 4th seed in the college football playoffs in the 2016–17 season. The Buckeyes fell to Clemson in that game 31–0. During the 2017–18 season, the Buckeyes played in the 2017 Cotton Bowl Classic, where they defeated the USC Trojans 24–7. Ohio State would play the following year in the 2019 Rose Bowl. It would be Ohio State's 15th Rose Bowl appearance and final bowl game for coach Urban Meyer. The Buckeyes would go on to defeat Pac-12 champion Washington 28–23. Their most recent bowl game was on January 1, 2022 when they narrowly defeated the Utah Utes 48-45 in the 2022 Rose Bowl. The Buckeye's bowl record stands at 26–28–0.

Key

Bowl games

Notes

Record by Bowl 

a The Gator Bowl was formerly called the TaxSlayer Bowl      b The ReliaQuest Bowl was formerly called the Outback Bowl and Hall of Fame Bowl

References
General

Specific

Ohio State Buckeyes

Ohio State Buckeyes bowl games